The 2019 Judo Grand Slam Baku was held in Baku, Azerbaijan from 10 to 12 May 2019.

Medal summary

Men's events

Source Results

Women's events

Source Results

Medal table

References

External links
 

2019 IJF World Tour
2019 Judo Grand Slam
Judo
Grand Slam Baku 2019
Judo
Judo